Hangmen Also Die! is a 1943 noir war film directed by the Austrian director Fritz Lang and written by John Wexley from a story by Bertolt Brecht (credited as Bert Brecht) and Lang. The film stars Hans Heinrich von Twardowski, Brian Donlevy, Walter Brennan, Alexander Granach and Anna Lee, and features Gene Lockhart and Dennis O'Keefe. Hanns Eisler composed the score, being nominated for an Academy Award, and the cinematographer was James Wong Howe.

The film is loosely based on the 1942 assassination of Reinhard Heydrich, the Nazi Reich Protector of German-occupied Prague, number-two man in the SS, and a chief mastermind of the Holocaust, who was known as "The Hangman of Prague."  The real Heydrich was assassinated by Czech resistance fighters parachuted from a British plane in Operation Anthropoid, but in the film, which was made during World War II before the full story had become public knowledge, Heydrich's killer is depicted as a member of the Czech resistance with ties to the Communist Party.

Hangmen Also Die! was Bertolt Brecht's only script for a Hollywood film: the money he earned from the project enabled him to write The Visions of Simone Machard, Schweik in the Second World War and an adaptation of Webster's The Duchess of Malfi. The collaboration of three prominent refugees from Nazi Germany – Lang, Brecht and Hanns Eisler – is an example of the influence this generation of German-speaking exiles had on American culture.

Plot
During the Nazi occupation of Czechoslovakia, surgeon Dr. František Svoboda, a Czech patriot, assassinates the brutal "Hangman of Europe", Reichsprotektor Reinhard Heydrich, but his getaway car is discovered and therefore his planned safe house must reject him. When a woman whom he does not know, named Mascha, deliberately misdirects German soldiers close to finding him, he seeks her home as an alternative safe house. This turns out to be the home of her father, history professor Stephen Novotny, whom the Nazis have banned from teaching. This plan works. But because the assassin now cannot be found, the Nazi leaders in Prague decide to create an incentive for him to turn himself in or for others to do so. They arrange – with the help of fifth-columnist Emil Czaka, a wealthy brewer – for 400 citizens, including Professor Novotny, to be executed, forty at a time, until the assassin is named. Through a complex series of events, however, the resistance manages to frame Czaka himself for the murder, but not before the Nazis have executed many of the hostages.

Cast

Cast notes
 One of von Twardowski's first film appearances was in the classic silent German expressionist horror film The Cabinet of Dr. Caligari (1920).
 George Irving, an actor and director who began in the early days of silent film – he directed 35 films, all silent, and appeared as an actor in 251 movies from 1914 to 1948 – has a small part as one of the hostages.
 Gravel-voiced character actor Lionel Stander has a small part as a taxi-driver.  Stander's film career has a ten-year gap in it due to being blacklisted after his Communist Party membership was revealed during hearings of the House Un-American Activities Committee (HUAC).
 Alexander Granach as "Gestapo Inspector Alois Gruber" was one of that band of Jewish escapees from Hitler (and Stalin) who contributed to Hollywood in those days. He had been one of the leading actors of the Weimar stage as well as a pioneer in films (e.g. Nosferatu, Kameradschaft). He died in 1945 while acting with Fredric March and Margo in A Bell for Adano.

Production
A number of working titles have been reported for Hangmen Also Die: "Never Surrender", "No Surrender", "Unconquered", "We Killed Hitler's Hangman" and "Trust the People". It has also been known as "Lest We Forget". It has been reported that when a book with a similar title to "Never Surrender" or "No Surrender" was published while the film was in production, the producers held a contest for the cast and crew to suggest a new title. The contest was won by a production secretary who received the $100 prize.

Teresa Wright, John Beal and Ray Middleton were also considered at one point to appear in the film, which went into production in late October 1942 and wrapped in mid-December of that year.

Director Fritz Lang had considered beginning the film with Edna St. Vincent Millay's poem "The Murder of Lidice".  He decided against it, but the poem does appear in MGM's film about Heydrich, Hitler's Madman (1943).

Hangmen was Brecht's only American film credit, although he supposedly worked on other scripts during his time in Hollywood, without receiving credit. He left the United States shortly after testifying before the House Un-American Activities Committee. John Wexley received sole credit for writing the screenplay after giving evidence to the Writers Guild that Brecht and Lang had only worked on the story. However, it seems that there is more Brecht in the script than is commonly accepted: the academic Gerd Gemünden writes that he spoke to Maurice Rapf, the judge on the case, who told him "it was obvious to the jury that Brecht and not Wexley was the main author, and that Wexley furthermore had a reputation as a credit stealer. It was only because of the fact that only written evidence was admissible, and since only Wexley's name appeared on all drafts, the jury had to rule in his favor." Wexley himself was blacklisted after he was named a communist in HUAC hearings.

Hangmen Also Die had a world premiere in Prague, Oklahoma on 27 March, an event which featured Adolf Hitler, Hirohito and Mussolini being hanged in effigy on Main Street. The mayors of Washington, Kansas, and London and Moscow, Texas attended. The film opened nationwide in the first days of April, beginning with 20 key cities.

Music
The music for Hangmen Also Die was composed by Hanns Eisler, Brecht's collaborator on a number of plays with music.  Eisler only worked on a small number of American films, the most notable of which are Deadline at Dawn (1946) and None But the Lonely Heart (1944), for which he was also nominated for an Oscar.

The song "No Surrender" in Hangmen was written by Eisler with lyrics by Sam Coslow.

Awards
Hangmen Also Die was nominated for two Academy Awards, for Hanns Eisler for "Best Music, Scoring of a Dramatic or Comedy Picture", and for Jack Whitney of Sound Services Inc. for "Best Sound, Recording". The movie is rated at 85% on Rotten Tomatoes.

See also
 Dramatic portrayals of Reinhard Heydrich
 Operation Anthropoid
 List of American films of 1943

Other films on this subject
Hitler's Madman (1943)
The Silent Village (1943)
Atentát (1964)
Operation Daybreak (1975)
Anthropoid (2016)
The Man with the Iron Heart (2016)

References

External links
 
 
 
 
 
 
 Still Photos from 'Hangmen Also Die' by Ned Scott

1943 films
1940s war drama films
American black-and-white films
Films directed by Fritz Lang
Plays by Bertolt Brecht
Films with screenplays by Bertolt Brecht
American war drama films
World War II films made in wartime
Films about Operation Anthropoid
United Artists films
Films produced by Arnold Pressburger
1943 drama films
American World War II films
1940s English-language films